The Grand Council of Vaud is the legislature of the canton of Vaud, in Switzerland.  Vaud has a unicameral legislature.  The Great Council has 150 seats, with members elected every five years.

In May 1981, Marguerite Narbel became the first woman to serve as president of the Grand Council of Vaud, holding the position until the following year. Narbel left the Grand Council in 1986.

Composition 
The largest groups are the Free Democratic Party (49 seats), followed by the Socialist group (35 seats), the People's Party (25 seats), the Green group (22 seats), the Green Liberals group (9 seats).
.

See also
 Council of State of Vaud
 List of cantonal legislatures of Switzerland

References

External links

  Official website

Vaud
Politics of the canton of Vaud
Vaud